Gangs of New York: Music from the Miramax Motion Picture is a soundtrack album for the 2002 film, Gangs of New York. The score is by Howard Shore. The rest of the selections are a mix of contemporary pop and world music compositions and tunes from mid-nineteenth century Ireland.

Track listing
 "Brooklyn Heights" 1 (Howard Shore) – 2:16
 Afro Celt Sound System: "Dark Moon, High Tide" (Simon Emmerson, Davy Spillane, Martin Russell) – 4:06
 Silver Leaf Quartet: "Gospel Train" (traditional) – 2:30
 U2 with Sharon Corr and Andrea Corr: "The Hands That Built America (Theme from Gangs of New York)" (Bono, The Edge, Adam Clayton, Larry Mullen Jr.) – 4:35
 Othar Turner and The Rising Star Fife and Drum Band: "Shimmy She Wobble" (Othar Turner) – 3:37
 Sidney Stripling: "Breakaway" (traditional) – 3:32
 Peter Gabriel feat. Nusrat Fateh Ali Khan: "Signal to Noise" [instrumental mix] (Gabriel) – 7:32 
 Finbar Furey: "New York Girls" (traditional) – 4:03
 Jimpson and Group: "The Murderer's Home" (traditional) – 0:47
 Jocelyn Pook: "Dionysus" (Pook) – 4:52
 "Brooklyn Heights" 2 (Shore) – 2:00
 Mariano De Simone: "Morrison's Jig/Liberty" (traditional) – 1:46
 Shu-De: "Durgen Chugaa" (traditional) – 0:53
 Maura O'Connell: "Unconstant Lover" (traditional) – 2:34
 Vittorio Schiboni, Massimo Giuntini, Rodrigo D'Erasmo and Mariano De Simone: "Devil's Tapdance" (traditional) – 1:47
 Anxi Jiang: "Beijing Opera Suite" (Da-Can Chen) – 3:27
 Linda Thompson: "Paddy's Lamentation" (traditional) – 2:53
 "Brooklyn Heights" 3 (Shore) – 3:15

Track 13 is mislabeled in the credits of the film and on the film's soundtrack release. The actual title of the track is "Buura".

Additional music heard in the film
These are songs heard in the film, but are not included on the soundtrack.
Othar Turner: "Shimmy She Wobble"
Badara N'Diaye: "Koukou Frappe"
The Dhol Foundation: "Drummer's Reel"
Beatrice Pradella, Marco Libanori and Angelo Giuliani: "Lilly Bell Quickstep"
Jimmie Strothers: "Poontang Little, Poontang Small"
Alabama Sacred Harp Convention: "Hallelujah/Amazing Grace"
Nathan Frazier & Frank Patterson: "Dan Tucker"
Music box recording: "The Last Rose of Summer"
Sonny Terry: "New Careless Love"
Afro Celt Sound System: "Saor-Free"
Eileen Ivers: "Lament for Staker Wallace"
Paul Hewson: "Báidín Fheidhlimí"
Dan Costescu: "Pigeon on the Gate"
Franco D'Aniello, Marco Libanori and Angelo Giuliani: "The White Cockade"
Piergiorgio Ambrosi: "A Mighty Fortress Is Our God" (Martin Luther)
Jeff Atmajian: "Cantata"
David Fanshawe: "Pakwach Acholi Bwala Dance"
Franco D'Aniello, Marco Libanori and Angelo Giuliani: "Belle of the Mohawk Vale"
Francesco Moneti: "Uncle Tom's Religion"
Mary Black: "Paddy's Lamentation" / Ships Are Sailing (Reel)
Mariano De Simone, Beatrice Pradella, Alessandro Bruccoleri and Lauren Weiss: "Massa Juba"
Ke-Wei Zhang: "Leaving Home"
Dr. Hukwe Zawose: "Chilumi"
Anna De Luca, Alessandro Bruccoleri and Giuseppe Salvagni: "Garryowen"
The Rising Star Fife and Drum Band: "Late at Midnight, Just a Little 'Fore Day"
Ike Caudill and Congregation of the Mt. Olivet Old Regular Baptist Church: "Guide Me O Thou Great Jehovah"
Jeff Johnson, Brian Dunning, John Fitzpatrick, Gregg Williams & Tim Ellis: "Vows"
The Chieftains: "Kerry Slides"

2002 soundtrack albums
Interscope Records soundtracks
Howard Shore soundtracks
Crime film soundtracks
Drama film soundtracks